748 Naval Air Squadron (748 NAS) was a Naval Air Squadron of the Royal Navy's Fleet Air Arm. It was initially formed, at RNAS St Merryn, as a Fighter Pool Squadron, before becoming No. 10 Naval Operational Training Unit, operating out of various Royal Navy Air Stations. During its existence, the squadron was equipped with various aircraft and marks operated by the Fleet Air Arm.

History of 748 NAS

Fighter Pool Squadron (1942-1943) 

No.10 Naval Operational Training Unit (1943-1946)
Within five weeks of arriving the squadron was on the move again, relocating to RNAS Yeovilton (HMS Heron), sited a few miles north of Yeovil, in Somerset, on 9 March 1944. Six months later and 748 NAS relocated again. It remained at Dale for almost one year before returning to RNAS St Merryn on the 14 August 1945.
748 NAS remained there for a further six months, disbanding on the 11 February 1946.

Aircraft flown 
The squadron was equipped with numerous types and marks of aircraft operated by the Fleet Air Arm including:

Corsair Mk II
Corsair Mk III
Corsair Mk IV
Firefly FR.I
Harvard
Hellcat I
Hurricane Mk I
Fulmar Mk.I
Fulmar Mk.II
M.9B Master I
M.19 Master II
Martinet TT.Mk I
Reliant
Seafire MkIb
Seafire F Mk IIc
Seafire F Mk III
Spitfire Mk I
Spitfire Mk Va
Spitfire Mk Vb
Wildcat Mk V
Wildcat Mk VI

Fleet Air Arm Bases 
748 NAS operated from a number of air bases:
Royal Naval Air Station ST MERRYN (12 October 1942 - 4 February 1944)
Royal Naval Air Station HENSTRIDGE (4 February 1944 - 9 March 1944)
 Royal Naval Air Station YEOVILTON (9 March 1944 - 1 September 1944)
Royal Naval Air Station DALE (1 September 1944 - 14 August 1945)
Royal Naval Air Station ST MERRYN (14 August 1945 - 11 February 1946)

References

Citations

Bibliography 

700 series Fleet Air Arm squadrons
Military units and formations established in 1942
Military units and formations of the Royal Navy in World War II